Sadat Fazel may refer to:
 Sadat Fazel 1
 Sadat Fazel 2
 Sadat Fazel 3